Wuhan Zhuankou Yangtze River Bridge, also known as Zhankou Yangtze River Highway Bridge, formerly known as Huangjiahu Yangtze River Bridge, Is a highway cable-stayed bridge located in Wuhan, Hubei, China, which crosses the Yangtze River and connects the Caidian District on the north shore of the Qingling Subdistrict (Hongshan District) of Xujiabao and the south bank are one of the important components and control engineering of Wuhan Fourth Ring Road, and Wuhan Junshan Yangtze River Bridge 9.2 kilometers, 7 kilometers from the Baishazhou Yangtze River Bridge downstream. The total length of the bridge is 5.296 kilometers. The main bridge structure is a five-span, one-twin, twin tower face steel box girder cable-stayed bridge with a main span of 760 meters and a bridge width of 46 meters.

See also
Yangtze River bridges and tunnels

References

Bridges in Wuhan
Bridges over the Yangtze River
Cable-stayed bridges in China
Bridges completed in 2014
Transport in Hubei
2014 establishments in China